Tamara Korpatsch (born 12 May 1995) is a German tennis player.
She has a career-high singles WTA ranking of No. 74, achieved on 28 November 2022, and doubles ranking of No. 291, achieved on 7 March 2022. She has won one singles title on WTA Challenger Tour and eleven singles titles on the ITF Circuit.

Professional career

2016
Korpatsch made her WTA Tour debut at the Swiss Open in the doubles draw, partnering Ekaterina Yashina.

2017
In December 2017, she won the singles title at the National German Championships.

2020: Grand slam debut
She made her Grand Slam main draw debut at the French Open and the US Open.

2022: Top 100 debut
In June 2022, Korpatsch made her third major main draw debut at the Wimbledon Championships where she lost to Heather Watson. Korpatsch had also entered the doubles competition but her partner, Harmony Tan, withdrew only an hour before her match prompting her to express, in a since-deleted social media post, her anger and disappointment at not being able to participate in the event on her debut.

She won her first WTA 125 tournament title at the Budapest Open.

She finished the year ranked No. 89 in the world.

Performance timeline

Only main-draw results in WTA Tour, Grand Slam tournaments, Fed Cup/Billie Jean King Cup and Olympic Games are included in win–loss records.

Singles
Current through the 2023 Linz Open.

Doubles

WTA career finals

Doubles: 1 (runner-up)

WTA 125 finals

Singles: 2 (1 title, 1 runner-up)

ITF Circuit finals

Singles: 17 (11 titles, 6 runner-ups)

Record against top-ten players 
Korpatsch's record against players who have been ranked in the top 10.

  Eugenie Bouchard 1–0
  Coco Gauff 1–0
  Maria Sakkari 1–0
  Timea Bacsinszky 1–1
  Paula Badosa 1–1
  Sara Errani 0–1
  Anett Kontaveit 0–1
  Veronika Kudermetova 0–1
  Jeļena Ostapenko 0–1
  Patty Schnyder 0–1
  Carla Suárez Navarro 0–1
  Iga Świątek 0–1
  Emma Raducanu 0–2

 as of 16 January 2023

References

External links

 
 

1995 births
Living people
Tennis players from Hamburg
German female tennis players